3 is the third studio album by American rock band The Atomic Bitchwax, released on June 7, 2005 via MeteorCity. It was the first album recorded with lead guitarist Finn Ryan of the band Core.

Track listing

Personnel
 Chris Kosnik –  bass, vocals
 Keith Ackerman –  drums, percussion
 Finn Ryan –  guitar, vocals

References

2005 albums
The Atomic Bitchwax albums
MeteorCity albums